Ariss may refer to:
 The community of the Guelph/Eramosa township, Ontario, Canada
 The Amateur Radio on the International Space Station project
 Ariss (surname), a surname